Haskovski Mineralni Bani, officially known as Mineralni Bani is a spa village in central southern Bulgaria, part of Haskovo Province. It is the administrative centre of Mineralni Bani Municipality, which lies in the westernmost part of Haskovo Province. The village's name means "Haskovo Mineral Baths".

Mineralni Bani lies at the northern foot of the Eastern Rhodope Mountains, east of the Mechkovets ridge. Its former name was Meriçler.

As of 31 December 2016 the village of Kolets has 1,155 inhabitants. The village is almost entirely inhabited by ethnic Bulgarians. 

Villages in Haskovo Province